Osmonalieva, Elnura (born January 12, 1981 in Osh, Kyrgyzstan) is a Kyrgyzstani film director

She attended a Soviet school and later studied in the US just a few years following the disintegration of the Soviet Union. She is an advocate for art and education. Her works explore human experiences in the circumstances of poverty and strong societal pressures.

Currently she is based in New York where she is a graduate film student at the Tisch School of the Arts at New York University.

She is a mother of three and made her recent short "Seide" while having her new baby.

Filmography 
 Farewell, short, Best Central Asian Auteur Film in 2009
 Almaz, documentary, Best Feature Length Documentary, Stars of Shaken, 2010
 Kyrgyzland, documentary, The Kyrgyz National Film Award of 2013
 Seide, short, official selections: Venice Films Festivals (2015), Sundance (2016), Int'l Santa Barbara Film Festival (2016), Clermont Ferrand Int'l Short Film Festival (2016), Manchester Film Festival (2016)

References

Kyrgyzstani film directors
1981 births
Living people
People from Osh
Tisch School of the Arts alumni
Kyrgyzstani women film directors